Extended Position Description (EPD) is a standard for describing chess games and chess positions and an extended set of structured attribute values using the ASCII character set.  It extends the Forsyth–Edwards Notation (FEN) except for the halfmove clock and full move number which are not mandatory, but implemented as operations hmvc and fmvn.
It is intended for data and command interchange among chessplaying computer programs. It is also intended to represent portable opening library repositories.

See also
 Forsyth–Edwards Notation
 Portable Game Notation

External links
 http://www.thechessdrum.net/PGN_Reference.txt
 https://github.com/fsmosca/PGN-Standard
 https://www.chessprogramming.org/Extended_Position_Description

References

Chess notation